Tony Robbins: I Am Not Your Guru is a 2016 documentary film directed by Joe Berlinger. It goes behind the scenes of Tony Robbins’ annual seminar "Date With Destiny" in Boca Raton, Florida. The film captures the efforts of producing the seminar as well as the effects on the participants.

Cast 
 Anthony Robbins
 Julianne Hough
 Maria Menounos
 Milana Vayntrub
 Sage Bonnie Humphrey
 Dawn Watson

Reception 
The documentary received mixed reviews after its debut on Netflix in 2016. Critics noted that it felt more like a tribute to Robbins rather than an exploration of his life and work. After the film’s debut, Business Insider interviewed Berlinger, in which he said that he intentionally wanted to make a positive film, and noted that he received encouragement from fellow documentarian Michael Moore for “going forward with an uplifting project he believed in, even though he predicted critics would harshly judge his decision to do so.”

References

External links
 
 
 

2016 documentary films
2016 films
Netflix original documentary films
Films directed by Joe Berlinger
Documentary films about Florida
Films shot in Florida
Boca Raton, Florida
Films produced by Joe Berlinger
2010s English-language films